In the mythology of the Bororó people of Brazil, Meri is a folk hero and sun-god.

A crater on Saturn's moon Hyperion has been named after him.

See also
 List of solar deities

References

Brazilian deities
Solar gods